Saudi Founder's Cup (Arabic: كأس المؤسس الملك عبدالعزيز), is an official Centennial football tournament, held every hundred years. organized by the Saudi Arabia Football Federation to celebrate the kingdom centenary.

All the Saudi clubs (152 club) in all divisions participate in this tournament. First played in 1999–2000 and won by Al-Hilal.

Final Match

References 

Football cup competitions in Saudi Arabia